Norwood is a home rule-class city in Jefferson County, Kentucky, United States. The population was 370 at the 2010 census.

Geography
It is bordered to the west by St. Matthews, to the north and east by Lyndon, and otherwise by consolidated Louisville/Jefferson County. U.S. Route 60 (Shelbyville Road) forms the southern boundary of Norwood.

Demographics

At the 2000 census there were 395 people in 156 households, including 114 families, in the city. The racial makeup of the city was 96.46% White, 1.01% African American, 0.76% Asian, 0.25% from other races, and 1.52% from two or more races. Hispanic or Latino of any race were 0.76%.

Of the 156 households 33.3% had children under the age of 18 living with them, 62.8% were married couples living together, 7.1% had a female householder with no husband present, and 26.9% were non-families. 22.4% of households were one person and 7.1% were one person aged 65 or older. The average household size was 2.53 and the average family size was 2.97.

The age distribution was 27.1% under the age of 18, 4.8% from 18 to 24, 26.6% from 25 to 44, 27.3% from 45 to 64, and 14.2% 65 or older. The median age was 40 years. For every 100 females, there were 107.9 males. For every 100 females age 18 and over, there were 94.6 males.

The median household income was $65,833 and the median family income  was $71,250. Males had a median income of $61,406 versus $31,923 for females. The per capita income for the city was $29,092. About 5.5% of families and 4.4% of the population were below the poverty line, including 4.8% of those under age 18 and 14.7% of those age 65 or over.

References

External links
City of Norwood official website

Cities in Jefferson County, Kentucky
Cities in Kentucky
Populated places established in 1975
1975 establishments in Kentucky